Schwendt is a municipality in the Kitzbühel district in the Austrian state of Tyrol located 17 km north of Kitzbühel and 6 km below Kössen. 

The name of the village comes from the old word "schwenden" (meaning to grub-up). 

Agriculture and tourism are its main sources of income.

Population

References

Kaiser Mountains
Cities and towns in Kitzbühel District